Dixon Advisory is the fourth largest self-managed superfund provider in Australia, and a subsidiary of Evans Dixon.

History
Dixon Advisory was established by its eponymous founder Daryl Dixon and his wife Kate Dixon in 1986. He remains the Executive Chairman of the company. By 2000 the firm had grown to 350 employees. Dixon Advisory was the fourth largest self-managed super fund provider in Australia. By 2015 the company had 4500 SMSFs under management, worth about $5 billion, and had around 8000 SMSF members. Dixon Advisory officials have also discussed national financial issues in the Australian media.

Merger
In 2017 the company merged with Evans & Partners into the company Evans Dixon, which became Dixon Advisory's parent company. The resulting company was a combined $18 billion wealth advisor firm. In 2018, its parent company was listed on the Australian Stock Exchange, raising $170 million in its IPO. After its first day of trading, the company had a $580.2 million market capitalization.

US business
In the United States, the company operates under the name Dixon Advisory USA. Investments have included the purchase and renovation of residential property in New York City. Dixon Advisory USA has since been closed due to the fund being poorly managed. The department previously oversaw a $590 million US Residential Masters Property fund.

Administration
On 19 January 2022 it was announced that Dixon Advisory had filed for voluntary administration, with the company facing an increasing number of claims and potential liabilities.

References

1986 establishments in Australia